This is a list of bridges documented by the Historic American Engineering Record in the U.S. state of Delaware.

Bridges

References

List
List
Delaware
Bridges
Bridges